Sununu is the surname of three U.S. politicians who are all from the same New Hampshire political dynasty:

 John H. Sununu (born 1939), governor of New Hampshire (1983-1989) and White House Chief of Staff for George H. W. Bush 1989-1991
 John E. Sununu (born 1964), son of John H. Sununu and brother of Chris Sununu, U.S. congressman (1997-2003) and U.S. senator 2003-2009
 Chris Sununu (born 1974), son of John H. Sununu and brother of John E. Sununu. Current governor of New Hampshire since 2017.